Information Libre is an album by punk band Sham 69, released in 1991.

Track listing
All songs by Jimmy Pursey and Dave Parsons unless noted
 "Break on Through (To the Other Side)" – 2:47 (Densmore, Krieger, Manzarek, Morrison)
 "Uptown" – 2:38
 "Planet Trash" – 4:19
 "Information Libertaire" – 3:26
 "Caroline's Suitcase" – 4:17
 "Feel It" – 3:17
 "King Kong Drinks Coca-Cola" – 2:32
 "Saturdays and Strangeways" – 3:27
 "Breeding Dinosaurs" – 4:01
 "Wild and Wonderful" – 4:54

Personnel
Jimmy Pursey – vocals, producer, sleeve design, cover design
Dave Guy Parsons – guitar, producer
Andy Prince – bass
Ian Whitewood – drums, keyboards
Stuart Epps – keyboards, producer, engineer, mixing, mixdown engineer
Patricia de Mayo – keyboards
Linda Paganelli – saxophone
John Etchells – mixing, mixdown engineer
Geoff Pesche – mastering
Dick Derry – digital mastering
Dick Meaney – digital mastering
Dave Holmes – artwork, typesetting
Laura Shillings – photography

References 

1991 albums
Sham 69 albums